Clinton "Tic" Bridge (born 30 November 1983) is an Australian professional darts player who plays in Professional Darts Corporation (PDC) events.

A bricklayer by trade, Bridge has mainly played on the Dartplayers Australia (DPA) Tour.

His first big exposure was qualifying for the 2013 Sydney Darts Masters, where he became the first qualifier to knock out a PDC seeded player, when he defeated Raymond van Barneveld 6–5, he would then lose 8–1 to Michael van Gerwen in the quarter-finals.

He has qualified for other World Series of Darts, but has always been knocked out in the first round to players including Phil Taylor and Dave Chisnall.

References

External links 

1983 births
Living people
Australian darts players
Professional Darts Corporation associate players
Sportspeople from Geelong